In combinatorics, the binomial transform is a sequence transformation (i.e., a transform of a sequence) that computes its forward differences. It is closely related to the Euler transform, which is the result of applying the binomial transform to the sequence associated with its ordinary generating function.

Definition
The binomial transform, T, of a sequence, {an}, is the sequence {sn} defined by

Formally, one may write 

for the transformation, where T is an infinite-dimensional operator with matrix elements Tnk.
The transform is an involution, that is,

or, using index notation,

where  is the Kronecker delta. The original series can be regained by

The binomial transform of a sequence is just the nth  forward differences of the sequence, with odd differences carrying a negative sign, namely:

where Δ is the forward difference operator.

Some authors define the binomial transform with an extra sign, so that it is not self-inverse:

whose inverse is

In this case the former transform is called the inverse binomial transform, and the latter is just binomial transform. This is standard usage for example in On-Line Encyclopedia of Integer Sequences.

Example

Both versions of the binomial transform appear in difference tables. Consider the following difference table:

Each line is the difference of the previous line. (The n-th number in the m-th line is am,n = 3n−2(2m+1n2 + 2m(1+6m)n + 2m-19m2), and the difference equation am+1,n = am,n+1 - am,n holds.)

The top line read from left to right is {an} = 0, 1, 10, 63, 324, 1485, ...  The diagonal with the same starting point 0 is {tn} = 0, 1, 8, 36, 128, 400, ...  {tn} is the noninvolutive binomial transform of {an}.

The top line read from right to left is {bn} = 1485, 324, 63, 10, 1, 0, ... The cross-diagonal with the same starting point 1485 is {sn} = 1485, 1161, 900, 692, 528, 400, ... {sn} is the involutive binomial transform of {bn}.

Ordinary generating function
The transform connects the generating functions associated with the series.  For the ordinary generating function, let

and

then

Euler transform
The relationship between the ordinary generating functions is sometimes called the Euler transform. It commonly makes its appearance in one of two different ways. In one form, it is used to accelerate the convergence of an alternating series. That is, one has the identity

which is obtained by substituting x = 1/2 into the last formula above. The terms on the right hand side typically become much smaller, much more rapidly, thus allowing rapid numerical summation.

The Euler transform can be generalized (Borisov B. and Shkodrov V., 2007):

where p = 0, 1, 2,…

The Euler transform is also frequently applied to the Euler hypergeometric integral .  Here, the Euler transform takes the form:

The binomial transform, and its variation as the Euler transform, is notable for its connection to the continued fraction representation of a number. Let  have the continued fraction representation

then

and

Exponential generating function
For the exponential generating function, let

and

then

The Borel transform will convert the ordinary generating function to the exponential generating function.

Integral representation
When the sequence can be interpolated by a complex analytic function, then the binomial transform of the sequence can be represented by means of a Nörlund–Rice integral on the interpolating function.

Generalizations
Prodinger gives a related, modular-like transformation: letting

gives

The rising k-binomial transform is sometimes defined as

The falling k-binomial transform is

.

Both are homomorphisms of the kernel of the Hankel transform of a series.

In the case where the binomial transform is defined as

Let this be equal to the function 

If a new forward difference table is made and the first elements from each row of this table are taken to form a new sequence , then the second binomial transform of the original sequence is,

If the same process is repeated k times, then it follows that,

Its inverse is,

This can be generalized as,

where  is the shift operator.

Its inverse is

See also
 Newton series
 Hankel matrix
 Möbius transform
 Stirling transform
 Euler summation
 Binomial QMF
 Riemann–Liouville integral
 List of factorial and binomial topics

References
 John H. Conway and Richard K. Guy, 1996, The Book of Numbers
 Donald E. Knuth, The Art of Computer Programming Vol. 3, (1973) Addison-Wesley, Reading, MA.
 Helmut Prodinger, 1992, Some information about the Binomial transform
 Michael Z. Spivey and Laura L. Steil, 2006, The k-Binomial Transforms and the Hankel Transform
 Borisov B. and Shkodrov V., 2007, Divergent Series in the Generalized Binomial Transform, Adv. Stud. Cont. Math., 14 (1): 77-82
 Khristo N. Boyadzhiev, Notes on the Binomial Transform, Theory and Table, with Appendix on the Stirling Transform (2018), World Scientific.

External links
Binomial Transform
Transformations of Integer Sequences

Transforms
Factorial and binomial topics
Hypergeometric functions